Kovvur is a town in West Godavari district, Andhra Pradesh, India.

It may also refer to:

Kovur, Prakasam district, a village in Prakasam district, Andhra Pradesh, India
Kovvur revenue division, a revenue division in the West Godavari district, Andhra Pradesh, India
Kovvur mandal, a mandal in West Godavari district, Andhra Pradesh, India
Kovvur railway station, a railway station in West Godavari district, Andhra Pradesh, India
Kovur, a village in Nellire district, Andhra Pradesh, India